Shiryayevo is a rural locality (a village) in Chertkovskoye Rural Settlement, Selivanovsky District, Vladimir Oblast, Russia. The population was 20 as of 2010. There are 2 streets.

Geography 
Shiryayevo is located 23 km northeast of Krasnaya Gorbatka (the district's administrative centre) by road. Nadezhdino is the nearest rural locality.

References 

Rural localities in Selivanovsky District